Late at Night is the third studio album by Spanish rock band Dover. It was released in Europe on 28 June 1999 under Loli Jackson Records and Chrysalis Records.

The album was recorded between January and March 1999 at Robert Lang Studios in Seattle, Washington. By February 2000, it had reached 300,000 copies sold, being certified 3× platinum. Likewise, it is critically regarded as the band's best album. The first single released was "DJ", which immediately reached number one on the charts.

Track listing 
Lyrics and music by Amparo Llanos and Cristina Llanos.

Personnel 
Dover
 Cristina Llanos – vocals and guitar
 Amparo Llanos – guitar
 Álvaro Díez – bass guitar
 Jesús Antúnez – drums

Technical personnel
 Chip Butters – engineering assistant
 Stephen Marcussen – mastering
 Barrett Jones – production, recording, mixing

Accolades

Charts

Certifications

Release history

References

External links 
 

1999 albums
Dover (band) albums
Chrysalis Records albums
Albums recorded at Robert Lang Studios